The 2003 Men's Hockey Champions Trophy was the 25th edition of the Hockey Champions Trophy men's field hockey tournament. It was held in Amstelveen, Netherlands from August 16–24, 2003.

Netherlands won their fifth title after defeated Australia 4–2 in the final.


Squads

Head Coach: Jorge Ruiz

Head Coach: Barry Dancer

Head Coach: Uli Forstner

Head Coach: Rajinder Singh

Head Coach: Joost Bellaart

Head Coach: Tahir Zaman

Umpires
Below is the list of umpires appointed by International Hockey Federation (FIH) for this tournament:

Amarjit Singh (MAS)
Stephen Brooks (ENG)
Mohammad Faiz (PAK)
Jason McCracken (NZL)
Ray O'Connor (IRL)
Tim Pullman (AUS)
Edmundo Saladino (ARG)
Rob ten Cate (NED)
Virendra Singh (IND)

Results
All times are Central European Summer Time (UTC+02:00)

Pool

Classification

Fifth and sixth place

Third and fourth place

Final

Final standings

References

External links
Official FIH website

C
C
Champions Trophy (field hockey)
2003